The Ride or TheRide may refer to:

Transportation
 The Ride (MBTA), Massachusetts Bay Transportation Authority's paratransit program
 RTD Bus & Rail in Denver, commonly referred to as TheRide
 TheRide, the common name of the Ann Arbor Area Transportation Authority

Film and TV
 The Ride (1994 film), a 1994 Czech drama film
 The Ride (1997 film), a 1997 film starring Michael Biehn

 The Ride (2010 film), a documentary by Vice
 The Ride (2018 film), a 2018 film starring Ludacris
 The Ride (2022 film), a 2022 film starring Paul Sorvino
 "The Ride" (The Sopranos), a 2006 episode of The Sopranos
 The Ride (Forgotten Realms), an area of the Moonsea region in Forgotten Realms

Music
 WXRC, a Charlotte, North Carolina, USA radio station known as 95.7 The Ride

Albums
 The Ride (4Him album), 1994
 The Ride (Los Lobos album), 2004
 The Ride (Catfish and the Bottlemen album), 2016
 The Ride (Nelly Furtado album), 2017
 The Ride (Small Town Titans album), 2020

Songs
 "The Ride" (David Allan Coe song), 1983
 "The Ride" (Alec Empire song), 2002
 "The Ride" (Drake song), 2011
 "The Ride", a song by Amanda Palmer from There Will Be No Intermission, 2019
 "The Ride" (Rafał Brzozowski song), represented Poland in Eurovision Song Contest 2021

See also
 Ride (disambiguation)